The men's kumite 55 kilograms competition at the 2010 Asian Games in Guangzhou, China was held on 24 November 2010 at the Guangdong Gymnasium.

Schedule
All times are China Standard Time (UTC+08:00)

Results

Main bracket

Repechage

References

External links
Official website

Men's kumite 55 kg